Savages is a 2001 drama film directed by  based on the play of the same name by José Luis Alonso de Santos. It stars Marisa Paredes and Imanol Arias.

Plot 
The fiction is set in Valencia, in the Mediterranean coast. A nurse (Berta) feels obliged to provide support to her deceased sister's three orphaned children: Raúl and Guillermo (two males members of neo-Nazi groupuscules), and Lucía (infatuated with Fausto, involved in the smuggling of immigrants to Europe). Berta's love affair with Eduardo (a policeman suffering from cirrhosis and Berta's patient) is disrupted by the latter's suspicion about the brutal murder of an immigrant, which the policeman attributes to Berta's nephews.

Cast

Production 
An adaptation of the 1998 play Salvajes by José Luis Alonso de Santos, the screenplay was penned by Jorge Juan Martínez, Carlos Molinero, Clara Pérez Escrivá, and Salvador Maldonado.

The film was produced by 's production company Brothers & Sisters alongside Passion Walls and Línea Sur PC, and it had the participation of TVE and Canal+.

Release 
Distributed by Alta Classics, the film was theatrically released in Spain on 28 September 2001. It was also selected for the 49th San Sebastián International Film Festival's 'New Directors' lineup.

Reception 
David Rooney of Variety deemed the "gritty, gripping tale of fanatical hatred in coastal Valencia" to be "stylishly directed and convincingly performed by a strong cast", adherence to the "vogue for convulsive hand-held camerawork" notwithstanding.

Accolades 

|-
| rowspan = "3" align = "center" | 2002 || rowspan = "3" | 16th Goya Awards || Best New Director || Carlos Molinero ||  || rowspan = "3" | 
|-
| Best Adapted Screenplay || Jorge Juan Martínez, Carlos Molinero, Clara Pérez Escrivá, Salvador Maldonado ||  
|-
| Best New Actress || María Isasi || 
|}

See also 
 List of Spanish films of 2001

References 

Films about neo-Nazis
Spanish romantic drama films
2001 romantic drama films
2000s Spanish-language films
Films about immigration to Spain
Films set in Valencia
Films about racism in Spain
Spanish films based on plays
Films about nurses
2000s Spanish films